Findel is a village in the commune of Sandweiler, in southern Luxembourg.  , the village had a population of 103. Findel is dominated by Luxembourg Findel Airport, the only international airport in Luxembourg.

It was at Findel that Grand Duchess Charlotte of Luxembourg returned to the country after its liberation at the end of World War II.

Climate

References

Sandweiler
Villages in Luxembourg